Duke's Big 4 is a studio album by the American pianist, composer and bandleader Duke Ellington, featuring a small group session with Joe Pass, Ray Brown and Louie Bellson, recorded in January 1973 and released on the Pablo label in 1974.

Reception
The AllMusic review by Scott Yanow states: "One of Duke Ellington's finest small group sessions from his final decade was this frequently exciting quartet date... Ellington's percussive style always sounded modern and he comes up with consistently strong solos... Highly recommended".

Track listing
All compositions by Duke Ellington except as indicated
 "Cotton Tail" – 4:17
 "The Blues" – 5:28
 "The Hawk Talks" (Louie Bellson) – 5:10
 "Prelude to a Kiss" (Ellington, Irving Gordon, Irving Mills) – 5:43
 "Love You Madly" – 6:38
 "Just Squeeze Me (But Please Don't Tease Me)" (Ellington, Lee Gaines) – 6:07
 "Everything But You" (Ellington, Don George, Harry James) – 5:19
Recorded in Los Angeles, California on January 8, 1973.

Personnel
Duke Ellington – piano
Joe Pass - guitar
Ray Brown - bass
Louie Bellson - drums

References

Pablo Records albums
Albums produced by Norman Granz
Duke Ellington albums
1974 albums